Richard Albert was president of the award-winning motion picture advertising agency Design Projects, Inc. from 1978 to 1992. Clients included Universal Pictures, MGM, 20th Century Fox, Warner Bros., and Columbia Pictures, as well as major independent and international distributors such as Cannon Films, Trimark Pictures, CBS Theatrical Films, Goldcrest, and Lorimar. Albert's firm was responsible for the movie poster designs for many films, including MacArthur, Sorcerer, Hard to Hold, The Final Countdown, Mutant, and Nightmares.

Albert consulted regularly with Menahem Golan at Cannon Films on how to market and pre-sell Cannon's films, and successfully started the foreign campaigns for Death Wish 2, New Year's Evil, Lady Chatterly's Lover, and Enter the Ninja. When Golan started 21st Century Films, he collaborated with Albert, who produced though his Sawmill Entertainment Corp. the Lambada dance movie The Forbidden Dance for Golan's foreign distribution and Columbia Pictures' U.S. theatrical release. Albert found the management for the band Kaoma when they were touring in the United States and licensed their hit song "Lambada" for the film. He also tried to book the band to appear in the movie, but the band's schedule did not fit with the fast production schedule, so he hired Kid Creole and the Coconuts to perform in the final scenes.

Albert worked with Film Ventures International from 1978 through the 1980s, creating advertising campaigns for the theatrical release of their films, including Kill or Be Killed, They Call Me Bruce, The House on Sorority Row, Breaker, Breaker, Great White, Mortuary, and Pieces. He was one of the last people to see Edward L. Montoro, Film Ventures founder.

In 1988, Albert formed Sawmill Entertainment, which was responsible for developing, producing and licensing most of his motion pictures. Besides producing The Forbidden Dance for Columbia Pictures and Menahem Golan, Albert collaborated with Mark Amin of Trimark Pictures, producing the horror film Demonwarp.  As with The Forbidden Dance, Demonwarp was  budgeted so that the distribution commitments that were made before the film went into production exceeded the cost of making the picture.

References

External links

Richard L. Albert at the State Bar of California

Living people
Year of birth missing (living people)
Place of birth missing (living people)
Nationality missing
American advertising executives